Alos may refer to:

Alos, Greece, an ancient city in Greece
Alos, Ariège, a commune of France
Alos, Tarn, a commune of France
ALOS (health care), an initialism used in managed health care, meaning "average length of stay"
 Advanced Land Observation Satellite, a Japanese satellite